A Future Lived in Past Tense is the second and final studio album by Seattle band Juno, released in 2001 on DeSoto Records.

Track listing
"A Thousand Motors Pressed Upon the Heart" – 4:44	
"Covered with Hair" – 5:43	
"When I Was in __" – 5:27
"Help Is on the Way" – 5:29
"The Trail of Your Blood In the Snow" – 5:27	
"The French Letter" – 10:12	
"Up Through the Night" – 3:15
"Things Gone and Things Still Here (We'll Need the Machine Guns By Next March)" – 8:12	
"We Slept In Rented Rooms (The Old School Bush)" – 9:17	
"You Are the Beautiful Conductor of This Orchestra" – 4:10
"Killing It in a Quiet Way" – 6:51
(Silence) – 0:50
"I'm Sorry You're Having Trouble... Goodbye" – 0:09

References

External links

2001 albums
Juno (band) albums
DeSoto Records albums